Alice Oya Ogebe (born 30 March 1995) is a Nigerian footballer who plays as a forward for Polish Ekstraliga club KKP Bydgoszcz and the Nigeria women's national team.

International career
Ogebe made her senior debut on 17 January 2019 in a 0–3 friendly loss to China PR.

References

Living people
Nigerian women's footballers
Nigeria women's international footballers
Women's association football forwards
1995 births
2019 FIFA Women's World Cup players
Nigerian expatriate women's footballers
Nigerian expatriate sportspeople in Serbia
Expatriate women's footballers in Serbia
Nigerian expatriate sportspeople in Spain
Expatriate women's footballers in Spain
Rivers Angels F.C. players
ŽFK Crvena zvezda players